The Laurens Janszoon Costerprijs (Dutch for Laurens Janszoon Coster Prize) is a Dutch literary award given to those who have made a contribution to Dutch literature. The award is named after Dutch purported inventor of a printing press Laurens Janszoon Coster. The award is given by the Stichting Laurens Janszoon Coster organisation and the award ceremony takes place in Haarlem, the city where Laurens Janszoon Coster was born.

Winners 

 1977: G.A. van Oorschot
 1978: Jan De Slegte
 1979: Miep Diekmann
 1981: Martin Mooy
 1983: Huib van Krimpen and Stichting Drukwerk in de Marge
 1985: Uitgeverij Meulenhoff
 1986: Herman de la Fontaine Verwey
 1988: Anthon Beeke
 1991: Wilma Schumacher
 1995: Joost Ritman
 1999: Kees Fens
 2005: Hans Keller
 2007: Bram de Does
 2009: Laurens van Krevelen
 2011: Gerrit Noordzij
 2013: Not awarded due to lack of funds

References 

Dutch literary awards
1977 establishments in the Netherlands
Awards established in 1977